Vu Televisions (also Vu Technologies) is a television brand and an LED TV and display manufacturer founded by Indian businessperson Devita Saraf, in United States in 2006. It is the largest-selling TV brand across e-commerce platforms in India.

History and products

Vu Technologies was founded as a high-end electronics company in 2006 by Indian businessperson Devita Saraf, who became its CEO and Design Head.

With a sales turnover of ₹1 billion, the company turned profitable in 2012. It started exporting televisions to the United States. Vu introduced ultra-high-definition television (4K HD) in 2014. At the end of the year, the company, valued at ₹2 billion, was selling about 40,000 televisions a year.

Vu had annual sales of $30 million in 2015, with  units sold. Vu Technologies gave away a 25% stake in the company to private equity investors.

In 2016, Vu introduced entertainment-focused apps on its TVs, with video on demand including Netflix as a preloaded feature. The company had 20 own stores in Indian cities. Already producing TVs with a range of input options, including features like MHL compatibility and built-in Miracast support, the company launched Vu SuperMac TV, India's first TV with built-in OS X Mountain Lion Operating System. It has also manufactured Windows and Android-based televisions. Its designer TV sets include one made in collaboration with designer Tarun Tahiliani, with a Swarovski crystal frame.

Aside from India, Vu Televisions are sold in 60 countries. The company sells a majority of its televisions online and has become the highest-selling TV brand across e-commerce platforms in India. In 2016, Flipkart became its exclusive online sales partner. The share of Vu grew to 40% of the total market share in the TV category for Flipkart.

Vu Technologies imports all the components for panel manufacturing from China, Taiwan, South Korea and Japan. The company had an annual turnover of ₹5 billion for 2016–17, and Flipkart reported that Vu had grown 200% on its marketplace in that period. According to analysts, the main reason for such growth was its offer of high-quality TV sets at affordable prices. Vu is expected to generate sales of about ₹850–9 billion by March 2018.

References

External links 

Electronics companies of India
Technology companies of India
Display technology companies
Consumer electronics brands
Indian companies established in 2006